The 1929 Miami Hurricanes football team represented the University of Miami as a member of Southern Intercollegiate Athletic Association (SIAA) in the 1929 college football season. The Hurricanes played their home games at Tamiami Park in Miami, Florida. The team was coached by J. Burton Rix, in his first and only year as head coach for the Hurricanes.

Schedule

References

Miami
Miami Hurricanes football seasons
Miami Hurricanes football